Joseph A. Martino (died 1983) was an American businessperson and administrator.

Early life
Martino was born in New York. He studied and graduated from Columbia University and Pace University in 1922.

Career
Martino joined NL Industries in 1916 and became the president in 1947.

In 1958, he appointed a commissioner of the Port Authority by Nelson Rockefeller.

As a philanthropist, in the 1950s and 1960s, he funded the construction of Lincoln Center campus. Fordham Building is named in his honor.

Awards and recognition
 Insignis Medal (1963)

References

1983 deaths